Karl-Heinz von Hassel (8 February 1939 – 19 April 2016) was a German actor. He appeared in more than 100 films and television shows between 1960 and 2012.

Born in Hamburg, he trained for a business career and also took acting lessons. From 1960 he made stage appearances at various theatres and from 1966 he appeared regularly on television and he later had significant roles in films directed by Rainer Werner Fassbinder. Hassel was a tall man who was often cast as police officers, but he also portrayed industrial workers. 

He died in Hamburg died aged 77 after a short illness.

Filmography

References

External links

 Karl-Heinz von Hassel obituary German

1939 births
2016 deaths
German male film actors
German male television actors
20th-century German male actors
21st-century German male actors
Male actors from Hamburg